St Aidan's Church in Harehills, Leeds, West Yorkshire is a Church of England parish church built in 1894. It is a large Victorian basilica-type red-brick building which is Grade II* listed. A church hall is adjacent. The architects were Johnson and Crawford Hick of Newcastle.

History
The church was consecrated by John Pulleine, Bishop of Richmond, on 13 October 1894. The first vicar was Samuel Mumford Taylor, who later became Bishop of Kingston-upon-Thames. His pastoral staff and mitres were bequeathed to the church.

They show scenes from St Aidan's life: feeding the poor, in Northumbria, preaching and the death of the saint. They are said to be best viewed at noon on a sunny winter's day, when they are lit by the nave windows. Brangwyn was initially commissioned to decorate the church by painting, and began this in 1910. However, he was concerned that the smoky atmosphere of Harehills would destroy it, so started again with a mosaic. On the south wall, behind the altar, is the scene of St Aidan preaching. The artist's initials, F. B., are subtly given in a pattern of stars.

The organ, dating from 1896, is by James Jepson Binns and is in unusual in being unmodified from its original condition.

Present day
The church is unusual among Anglican parish churches in celebrating the Mass daily. It was previously in the Diocese of Ripon and Leeds, whose cathedral is at Ripon. However the church became part of the Diocese of Leeds in 2014.

From January 2012 until 2017, the parish was united with Leeds All Souls.

Gallery

See also
Grade II* listed buildings in Leeds
Listed buildings in Leeds (Gipton and Harehills Ward)

References

External links 
 St Aidan's Church website
 
 Exterior photo on Leodis database
 Aerial view on Leodis database

Aidan
Church of England church buildings in West Yorkshire
Churches completed in 1894
19th-century Church of England church buildings
Anglican Diocese of Leeds
Harehills
Anglo-Catholic church buildings in West Yorkshire